Kpassagnon Gneto (born 25 January 1971) is an Ivorian footballer. He played in 19 matches for the Ivory Coast national football team from 1991 to 1997. He was also named in Ivory Coast's squad for the 1996 African Cup of Nations tournament.

References

1971 births
Living people
Ivorian footballers
Ivory Coast international footballers
1996 African Cup of Nations players
Place of birth missing (living people)
Association football defenders